Wild Rose was a federal electoral district in Alberta, Canada, that was represented in the House of Commons of Canada from 1988 to 2015. It had been considered a safe seat for the Conservative Party of Canada.

Geography 
The district was located in the southwest part of Alberta, stretching from the British Columbia border to the outer northern suburbs of Calgary. Within the large riding were: the City of Airdrie, the towns of Olds, Didsbury, Cochrane, Canmore, Sundre, and Banff, the Municipal District of Bighorn No. 8, Mountain View County, Improvement District No. 9, and parts of Clearwater County and Rocky View County. The Stoney First Nation was also located within the riding. The riding was bounded by British Columbia to the west, Calgary to the southeast and Red Deer to the northeast.

History 
The electoral district was created in 1986 from Bow River, Red Deer and Macleod ridings.

In 2003, about 30% of this district was transferred to Crowfoot riding and  about 4% of Red Deer riding was transferred to this district.

Since its creation Wild Rose was one of the safest ridings in the country for the Conservative Party and its predecessors, which had won every election since 1993 by lopsided margins. Neither the Liberals nor the New Democrats had ever secured more than 15 percent of the vote in Wild Rose. In the 2006 election, the Green Party finished a distant second with 10.84 percent of the popular vote, which was among the highest percentages received for the Green Party in that election. The Green Party candidate, Lisa Fox, was again the second-place finisher in the October 2008 election, finishing ahead of the Liberal, New Democratic and Libertarian candidates with 6,389 votes, but far behind the winner Richards, who won 72.9 percent of all votes cast (36,869 votes total). In 2011 Richards defeated all of his opponents combined by a nearly three-to-one margin.

The riding was abolished in 2015.  Most of the riding became Banff—Airdrie. A smaller part was transferred to Red Deer—Mountain View while a small portion went to Yellowhead.

List of Members of Parliament 

This riding has elected the following members of the House of Commons of Canada:

Election results

See also 
 List of Canadian federal electoral districts
 Past Canadian electoral districts

References

 Expenditures - 2008
 Expenditures - 2004
 Expenditures - 2000
 Expenditures - 1997

Notes

External links 
 Elections Canada
 Website of the Parliament of Canada

Former federal electoral districts of Alberta
Airdrie, Alberta
Banff, Alberta
Canmore, Alberta